Domenico Rinaldi (born 24 April 1959) is an Italian diver. He competed at the 1984 Summer Olympics and the 1988 Summer Olympics.

References

External links
 

1959 births
Living people
Italian male divers
Olympic divers of Italy
Divers at the 1984 Summer Olympics
Divers at the 1988 Summer Olympics
Sportspeople from the Province of Brescia